XOC or similar can mean:
Lady Xoc, a Maya Queen consort in Yaxchilan
A Mayan word for "fish" which may be the origin of the English word "shark"

Distinguish from
Exocet